Salden may refer to:

Salden, Buckinghamshire, seat of John Fortescue of Salden, the third Chancellor of the Exchequer of England

People with the surname
Thor Salden, the winning contestant in the Belgian pre-selections of the Junior Eurovision Song Contest 2006